William Kinwolmarsh (d. December 1422) was a royal treasurer of England for about seven days, during 1422.

Biography
Kinwolmarsh was appointed as Provost of Beverley Minster during 1419, followed by the position of Deputy Treasurer of England (1417–1421), and the royal household's  Lord High Treasurer, a position that he held for only one week before his death.

He had been appointed by the widowed Lucia, Countess of Kent as a deputy to regulate her dower. He was given a role in the visit to France of Queen Catherine of Valois. In the reign of Henry IV, Kinwolmarsh was Dean of St-Martin's le-Grand.
He is noted as particularly active in fulfilling his duties as a royal councillor and administrator.

See also 
 John Stafford (bishop)
 Henry FitzHugh

References

External links 
 archive.org from google.co.uk seaRch-engine list

1422 deaths
Lord High Treasurers of England
Year of birth unknown